Košarkaški klub Lavovi 063, commonly referred to as KK Lavovi 063, was a men's professional basketball club based in Zemun, near Belgrade, Serbia and Montenegro.

The club used to compete in the Serbia and Montenegro League from 2002 to 2005, as well as in the 2004–05 FIBA Europe League.

Coaches

  Dražen Dalipagić (2000–2001)
  Predrag Jaćimović (2001)
  Predrag Badnjarević (2001–2002)
  Milovan Stepandić (2002–2003)
  Predrag Jaćimović (2003)
  Jovica Arsić (2003–2004)
  Jovica Antonić (2005)

Notable players

  Mileta Lisica
  Mijailo Grušanović
  Milivoje Božović
  Saša Bratić
  Vladimir Micov
  Mladen Pantić
  Marko Simonović
  Greg Newton
  Chris Carr

International record

References

External links
 KK Lavovi 063 at srbijasport.net
 KK Lavovi 063 at eurobasket.com

Lavovi 063
Basketball teams disestablished in 2005
Sport in Zemun